"Filth in the Beauty" is a maxi-single by The Gazette. It was released as two different types: the Optical Impression and Auditory Impression, the first coming with a DVD with the music video for the song "Filth in the Beauty", and the second with a bonus track.

Track listing

Filth in the Beauty: Optical Impression
Disc one
 "Filth in the Beauty" – 4:11
 "Rich Excrement" –  3:12
Disc two (DVD)
 "Filth in the Beauty" – 4:11
 "Making of Filth in the Beauty"

Filth in the Beauty: Auditory Impression
 "Filth in the Beauty" – 4:11
 "Rich Excrement" – 3:12
 "Crucify Sorrow" – 4:06

Note
 The music video for "Filth in the Beauty" was already viewable a few months before the official release of the single.
 The single reached a peak mark of #5 on the Japanese Oricon Weekly Charts.

References

2006 singles
The Gazette (band) songs
King Records (Japan) singles
2006 songs
Song articles with missing songwriters